Willem de Sitter (1872–1934) was a Dutch mathematician, physicist and astronomer.

De Sitter may also refer to:
De Sitter (crater), a lunar crater
1686 De Sitter, an asteroid

People with the surname
 Ulbo de Sitter (1902–1980), Dutch geologist
 Ulbo de Sitter (sociologist) (1930–2010), Dutch sociologist whose work has been further developed by Jan in 't Veld

See also
De Sitter space and anti-de Sitter space, models of spacetime
De Sitter universe, a solution to general relativity
De Sitter effect (disambiguation)
Sitter (disambiguation)